Noelle Beck (born December 14, 1967, in Baltimore, Maryland) is an American actress, best known for her role as Trisha Alden on the ABC daytime soap opera Loving.

Career
Beck graduated from Baltimore School for the Arts. She portrayed Loving Trisha Alden from December 1984 to March 26, 1993, returning briefly in 1995 as the series neared cancellation. On May 8, 2008, she took over the role of Lily Walsh on the CBS soap As the World Turns and remained until the series' cancellation on September 17, 2010.

In 1996, Beck was cast in the second season of the CBS primetime soap Central Park West as Jordan Tate. In 2000, she was a series regular on the comedy TV series Tucker. Beck also guest starred as Mr. Big's ex-wife Barbara in a first season episode of Sex and the City in July 1998.

Beck appeared on Law & Order and Law & Order: Special Victims Unit in 2000, on Law & Order: Criminal Intent in 2002, and returned in 2011 to Special Victims Unit and to Criminal Intent.

Personal life
She is of Italian and German ancestry. Beck married Eric Petterson on  August 5, 1990. They have two daughters, Forrest (born 1991) and Spencer (born 1992), and a son, Brock (born 1998).
They divorced in 2017.

Filmography

Film

Television

References

External links
 

American television actresses
American soap opera actresses
1967 births
Living people
Actresses from Baltimore
20th-century American actresses
21st-century American actresses